The Invisible Divorce is a 1920 American silent drama film released by Select Pictures and starring Leatrice Joy. It is not known whether the film currently survives.

Cast
 Leatrice Joy as Pidgie Ryder
 Walter McGrail as Jimmy Ryder
 Walter Miller as John Barry
 Grace Darmond as Claire Kane Barry
 Tom Bates as Pete Carr

References

External links

 

1920 films
1920 drama films
1920s English-language films
Silent American drama films
American silent feature films
American black-and-white films
American independent films
Selznick Pictures films
1920s independent films
1920s American films